The West Virginia spring salamander (Gyrinophilus subterraneus) is a species of troglobitic salamander in the family Plethodontidae. It is endemic to West Virginia, the United States.

The salamander is only found in the General Davis Cave in Greenbrier County and lives in cave stream passages with large amounts of decaying organic matter. It is considered endangered.

General Davis Cave forms the downstream end of the 3.5 mi2 Davis Hollow drainage basin.  This cave has been purchased by The Nature Conservancy and is closed to the public in order to protect this salamander and a small bat colony.

Like the Western grotto salamander, the West Virginia spring salamander can undergo complete metamorphosis, which is very rare among cave salamanders. It is not known how often metamorphosis occurs, but when it does, it happens after the larvae has reached a very large size.

References

Citations

Further reading
 Salamanders of West Virginia by Thomas Pauley
 Culver, David. C, Kane, Thomas C, Fong, Daniel. 1995.  Harvard University Press. "Adaptation and Natural Selection in Caves," the Evolution of Gammarus minus" 
 Jones, William K. Karst Waters Institute. 1997. "Karst Hydrology Atlas of West Virginia"

External links
The Greenbrier River Watershed Association — for more information about the karstic biota of the region.
The Nature Conservancy in West Virginia
West Virginia Cave Conservancy A 501(c)3 Nonprofit dedicated to acquiring caves and the conservation and protection of caves within West Virginia.
National Speleological Society — promoting interest in and to advance in any and all ways the study and science of speleology, the protection of caves and their natural contents, and to promote fellowship among those interested therein.

Cave salamanders
Gyrinophilus
Salamander, West Virginia spring
Ecology of the Appalachian Mountains
Endemic fauna of West Virginia
Greenbrier County, West Virginia
Salamander, West Virginia spring
Taxonomy articles created by Polbot
Amphibians described in 1977